Grass Lake is a lake in Kanabec County, in the U.S. state of Minnesota.

Grass Lake was named for the abundant marsh grass in the lake.

See also
List of lakes in Minnesota

References

Lakes of Minnesota
Lakes of Kanabec County, Minnesota